Readercon is an annual science fiction convention, held every July in the Boston, Massachusetts area, in Burlington, Massachusetts. It was founded by Bob Colby and Eric Van in 1987 with the goal of focusing almost exclusively on science fiction/fantasy/slipstream/speculative fiction in the written form (on the rare occasion that there is a discussion held about non-written science fiction, it will have a tongue-in-cheek title such as "Our biannual media panel"). Past guests of honor have included authors such as Greer Gilman, Gene Wolfe, Octavia Butler, Samuel R. Delany, Karen Joy Fowler, Brian Aldiss, Nalo Hopkinson, Joe Haldeman, Caitlín R. Kiernan, Peter Straub, and China Miéville, and editors such as Ellen Datlow and David G. Hartwell. The convention also makes a point of honoring a deceased author as the Memorial Guest of Honor. In 2009, for instance, the guests of honor were the living writers Elizabeth Hand and Greer Gilman and the memorial guest of honor was Hope Mirrlees.

As of 2012, attendance at the convention has been consistently around 850 for several years.

From 2005 to 2011, Readercon was the official venue for presentation of the Rhysling Award. It has hosted the Shirley Jackson Awards since their founding in 2007.

References

External links 
 Official site
 Twitter account

Festivals in Massachusetts
Recurring events established in 1988
Science fiction conventions in the United States